Rubus scandens is an uncommon Mexican species of brambles in the rose family. It has been found only in the State of Veracruz in eastern Mexico.

Rubus scandens is a climbing perennial sometimes reaching 6 meters above the ground. Stems do not have prickles, but petioles do. Leaves are palmately compound with 5 thick, leathery leaflets. Flowers are white or pink. Fruits are dark purple, the drupelets falling apart separately.

References

scandens
Flora of Veracruz
Plants described in 1853